The Statute Law Revision Act 1867 (30 & 31 Vict c 59) is an Act of the Parliament of the United Kingdom.

It was intended, in particular, to facilitate the preparation of a revised edition of the statutes.

This Act was partly in force in Great Britain at the end of 2010.

The enactments which were repealed (whether for the whole or any part of the United Kingdom) by this Act were repealed so far as they extended to the Isle of Man on 25 July 1991.

This Act was retained for the Republic of Ireland by section 2(2)(a) of, and Part 4 of Schedule 1 to, the Statute Law Revision Act 2007.

The Schedule to this Act was repealed by section 1 of, and the Schedule to, the Statute Law Revision Act 1893.

See also
Statute Law Revision Act

References
Halsbury's Statutes
Council of Law Reporting. The Law Reports. The Public General Statutes, with a list of the local and private Acts, passed in the thirtieth and thirty-first years of the reign of Her Majesty Queen Victoria. London. 1867. Pages 622 to 748.
A Collection of the Public General Statutes passed in the Thirtieth and Thirty-first Years of Her Majesty Queen Victoria. Printed by Eyre and Spottiswoode, Printers to the Queen. London. 1867. Pages 374 to 460. Digitized copy from Google Books.
  — text of the bill includes commentary justifying each repeal, which is not in text of the act as passed.

External links
A Collection of the Public General Statutes passed in the Thirtieth and Thirty-first Years of Her Majesty Queen Victoria. Printed by Eyre and Spottiswoode, Printers to the Queen. London. 1867. Pages 374 to 460. Statute Law Revision Act 1867
List of amendments and repeals in the Republic of Ireland from the Irish Statute Book

United Kingdom Acts of Parliament 1867